La Bohème is a song written by French lyricist Jacques Plante and Armenian-French musician Charles Aznavour. It is Aznavour's signature song, as well as one of the most popular French-language songs and a staple of French chanson.

Lyrics
A painter, recalling his younger years in Montmartre, remembers his artistic life and the years when he was hungry but happy. According to Aznavour, this song is a farewell to the last days of bohemian Montmartre. He also recorded Italian, Spanish, English, and German versions, as well as a rare Portuguese recording. It was performed at virtually every one of his concerts.

International charts
The song was first recorded by Aznavour in 1965. It became an international hit song in 1965 and was in TOP10 charts of Argentina (No. 3), Brazil (especially Rio de Janeiro (No. 5)), France (No. 1) and other countries.

Cover versions
Gigliola Cinquetti recorded a version of the song in Italian in 1966.

The Greek Cypriot singer Anna Vissi recorded a version of the song in Greek for her 1981 self-titled album. The song was called "Kséhasé me" (Ξέχασέ με, Forget me); Greek lyrics by Yiannis Parios.

It was later done in English by Dubstar, who included their version as a filler track for the release of their single "No More Talk".

In 1983, serbian singer Dragan Stojnic recorded a version of La Bohéme in Serbian on his album C' est la vie. 

In 2004, Jason Kouchak recorded a version of this song for Aznavour's 80th birthday .

In 2005, Mafalda Arnauth, a Portuguese fado singer recorded a version of this song for her fourth album Diário.

A re-interpretation was also done by electronic musician Nicolas Jaar, who used it in many of his live sets.

Kendji Girac's interpretation of the song, heavily influenced by Spanish and Romani culture, appeared on the 2014 tribute album Aznavour, sa jeunesse. It reached number 61 on the French SNEP singles chart.

The African-Spanish singer Buika recorded a version of the song in Spanish, called "La Bohemia," for her 2008 album, Niña de Fuego.

Angelina Jordan recorded an English version of the song on her 2018 album It's Magic.

Armenian jazz singer Elvina Makarian covered the song on her album International.

See also
La bohème (album)

References

Songs about nostalgia
Songs about Paris
Charles Aznavour songs
French songs
Songs written by Charles Aznavour
1965 songs
1965 singles
Barclay (record label) singles
Montmartre
Bohemianism